Elachista baldizzonei is a moth of the family Elachistidae that is found in Italy and Austria.

References

baldizzonei
Moths described in 1996
Moths of Europe